Robert Jeffrey Rush (born February 27, 1955) is a former professional American football center. He  played in the National Football League (NFL) for the San Diego Chargers (1977–1982) and the Kansas City Chiefs (1983–1985). Fellow classmates recall that from August, 1970 to June, 1973 (his sophomore to senior years) Bob was a stand-out member of the varsity football team for the Northwest High School "Vikings" in Clarksville, Tennessee; he earned many recognitions at the regional and state levels.  He played college football for the University of Memphis.

References

Bob Rush. Pro Football Reference. Retrieved 2021-02-07.

1955 births
Living people
Players of American football from Santa Monica, California
American football centers
Memphis Tigers football players
San Diego Chargers players
Kansas City Chiefs players